Arizona is a state located in the Western United States. According to the 2020 United States Census, Arizona is the 14th most populous state with 6,392,017 inhabitants and the 6th largest by land area spanning . Arizona is divided into 15 counties and contains 91 incorporated cities and towns. Incorporated places in Arizona are those that have been granted home rule, possessing a local government in the form of a city or town council. Most of the population is concentrated within the Phoenix metropolitan area, with an 2020 census population of 3,331,925 ( of the state population).

Phoenix is the capital and largest city by population in Arizona with 1,608,139 residents, is ranked as the fifth most populous city in the United States, and land area spanning  as of the 2020 census. The oldest incorporated place in Arizona is Tucson which incorporated in 1877 and the most recent was the town of Tusayan which incorporated in March 2010.

Municipal incorporation
The Arizona Constitution has, since its ratification in 1912, allowed for the creation of municipal corporations in any community with a population of 3,500 or greater. According to the Constitution, a municipal charter cannot be created by special laws or by the legislature, but rather by the communities themselves as provided by general law. The population limit specified by the constitution was lowered by state law to a minimum of population of 1,500 for most locations, and further reduced to 500 for communities located within  of a national park or national monument. State law further restricts the incorporation of new municipalities within urbanized areas, which are defined as a specific buffer zone surrounding existing cities and towns.

State law allows for the incorporation of a community as either a city or a town; the only additional requirement to incorporate as a city is a minimum population of 3,000. Cities and towns in Arizona function largely in an identical manner, but cities are provided with additional powers that a town charter does not provide, limited primarily to certain powers regarding the regulation of utilities and construction within the city limits. State law allows adjoining towns to merge and it allows a city to annex a town, but it does not allow cities to merge. Additionally, a town may change its form of government to a city upon reaching the minimum population of 3,000. There are, however, large communities that have remained incorporated as a town in spite of attaining a large population; Gilbert, with 267,918 residents, remains incorporated as a town.

Twenty Arizona municipalities were incorporated before 1912, when the state was admitted to the Union. As such, these cities and towns were incorporated by means other than those stipulated by current state law and the constitution. Phoenix, for example, was incorporated in 1881 by an act of the Territorial Legislature.

List of cities and towns

See also 
 List of counties in Arizona
 List of Indian reservations in Arizona
 List of census-designated places in Arizona

Notes

References

Local government in Arizona
Arizona
Cities

Arizona